Álvaro Fernández (born 11 October 1985) is a Uruguayan footballer. He currently plays as a midfielder for Plaza Colonia.

Career

Club
Fernández began his career with Atenas de San Carlos. His performances for Atenas led him to sign for Montevideo Wanderers in 2007.

In his one season with Wanderers Fernández appeared in 27 league matches scoring 1 goal. In 2008, he joined Mexican side Puebla before returning to Uruguay to play for top side Nacional. In the 2009 Copa Libertadores Second Stage, Fernández scored a goal against Club Nacional of Paraguay and River Plate. While at Nacional Fernández scored several key goals in helping his side capture the 2008–09 league title.

He was then loaned out to Portuguese side Vitória in 2009. This was his first club experience outside of the Americas. In 2010, he was again loaned out to Universidad de Chile. During his stay at the club, he scored a goal in a 3–2 win at the Maracanã against Brazilian club Flamengo in the quarterfinals of the 2010 Copa Libertadores.

On 21 July 2010, rumors began circulating that Fernández had been transferred to the Seattle Sounders FC. On 29 July, the Sounders announced the signing was complete. Fernández became the third Designated Player in the team's history. He made his first appearance for the Sounders on 31 July as a substitute in a 1–0 win against the San Jose Earthquakes. On 3 August, Fernández came on as a substitute and scored his first goal for the Sounders as in a 1–1 draw (2–1 aggregate score) against Isidro Metapán to get the Sounders into the group stage of the CONCACAF Champions League.

On 27 July 2012, Fernández was traded to the Chicago Fire for allocation money. This move opened up a DP slot for newcomer Christian Tiffert. He signed a 6-month long loan deal with Qatari club Al Rayyan on 16 January 2013.

Fernández was again loaned out by Chicago on 9 July 2013 when he returned to his former club Nacional.

International
Fernández made his first international appearance for Uruguay on 1 April 2009. He came on as a substitute in the 40th minute during a World Cup qualifying match against Chile, which ended as a 0–0 draw. He has won 11 caps for the Uruguay national football team. During qualification Fernández played in six games and played 246 minutes, 41 minutes per game. Fernández played for Uruguay at the 2010 FIFA World Cup in South Africa appearing in four matches helping Uruguay to a fourth-place finish.

Personal life
During the week of 6 September 2010, Fernández's wife gave birth to a baby boy, whom they named Bobby Valentino.

Fernández received a U.S. green card in March 2012. This qualifies him as a domestic player for MLS roster purposes.

Honours
Club Nacional de Football
Uruguayan Primera División (1): 2008–09

Seattle Sounders FC
Major League Soccer: 2016
Lamar Hunt U.S. Open Cup (2): 2010, 2011

Al Rayyan SC
Emir of Qatar Cup (1): 2013

References

External links

1985 births
Living people
People from Soriano Department
Uruguayan footballers
Uruguayan expatriate footballers
Uruguay international footballers
2010 FIFA World Cup players
Atenas de San Carlos players
Montevideo Wanderers F.C. players
Club Nacional de Football players
Club de Gimnasia y Esgrima La Plata footballers
Club Puebla players
Vitória F.C. players
Al-Rayyan SC players
Universidad de Chile footballers
Seattle Sounders FC players
Chicago Fire FC players
San Martín de San Juan footballers
San Martín de Tucumán footballers
Rampla Juniors players
Club Plaza Colonia de Deportes players
Uruguayan Primera División players
Chilean Primera División players
Argentine Primera División players
Primeira Liga players
Liga MX players
Major League Soccer players
Qatar Stars League players
Expatriate footballers in Qatar
Expatriate footballers in Mexico
Expatriate footballers in Portugal
Expatriate footballers in Chile
Expatriate footballers in Argentina
Expatriate soccer players in the United States
Uruguayan expatriate sportspeople in Portugal
Uruguayan expatriate sportspeople in Mexico
Uruguayan expatriate sportspeople in Qatar
Uruguayan expatriate sportspeople in Chile
Uruguayan expatriate sportspeople in Argentina
Designated Players (MLS)
Association football midfielders